"More of You" is the lead single, released on June 24, 2014, from Colton Dixon's second studio album, Anchor.

Composition
"More of You" is originally in the key of B♭ Major, with a tempo of 80 beats per minute. Written in common time, Dixon's vocal range spans from B♭3 to E♭5 during the song.

Music video
A music video for the single "More of You" was released on July 15, 2014. The video has over nine million views on YouTube.

Charts

Weekly charts

Year-end charts

References 

2014 singles
2014 songs
Sparrow Records singles
Songs written by Ben Glover